Juan Manuel Dalmau Ramírez (born July 23, 1973) is a Puerto Rican politician, attorney and a former candidate for Governor of Puerto Rico for the Puerto Rican Independence Party. He was previously a member of the Senate of Puerto Rico.

Education
Juan Dalmau Ramírez graduated from Notre Dame High School. In 1995 he obtained a bachelor's degree from the University of Puerto Rico (UPR) in Political Sciences, and a Juris Doctor from the University of Puerto Rico School of Law three years later.

Juan Dalmau was elected editor-in-chief of the UPR Law School's Law Review Journal. He represented the University of Puerto Rico's Law Review in travels abroad, including a trip to Universitat de Barcelona, in Barcelona, Spain. After graduation, Dalmau served as a law clerk for the Chief Justice of the Puerto Rico Supreme Court. In 2000, Juan Dalmau graduated from Harvard University Law School’s Graduate Program, earning his LL.M.

Career
Since then, Dalmau-Ramírez has served as a Legislative Adviser for Senator Manuel Rodríguez Orellana and Fernando Martín, before being elected to serve as Party Commissioner in Municipality Affairs and PIP Secretary General.  Juan Dalmau-Ramírez currently serves as the Electoral Commissioner of the Puerto Rican Independence Party to Puerto Rico's State Electoral Commission (CEE), in addition to his position as secretary general. He was the Puerto Rican Independence Party candidate for governor in 2012 and 2020. In 2020, several days after the Puerto Rico General Election, Dalmau announced he would join the political analysis team of local news chain Noticentro al amanecer.

Family life
Dalmau Ramirez is married and has two children.

See also
Latin American and Caribbean Congress in Solidarity with Puerto Rico’s Independence
Manuel Rodríguez Orellana - PIP Secretary of Relations with North America

References

External links

 Construyamos Juntos la Patria Nueva: Juan Manuel Dalmau Ramírez. "Biografia Juan Dalmau, Gobernador." (Timeline biography of Juan Dalmau.) 2020. Accessed 1 October 2020.

1973 births
Harvard Law School alumni
Living people
People from Caguas, Puerto Rico
People from San Juan, Puerto Rico
Puerto Rico Independence Party politicians
Puerto Rican independence activists
Puerto Rican lawyers